Salif Keïta (born 19 October 1975, in Dakar) is a Senegalese former professional footballer who played as a striker.

Honours
Genk
Belgian Cup: 1997–98

References

1975 births
Living people
Association football forwards
Senegalese footballers
Senegalese expatriate footballers
Senegal international footballers
Belgian Pro League players
2. Bundesliga players
Football League (Greece) players
Cypriot First Division players
Cypriot Second Division players
K.R.C. Genk players
K.V. Kortrijk players
Hannover 96 players
1. FC Union Berlin players
Rot-Weiß Oberhausen players
TuS Koblenz players
Olympiakos Nicosia players
APEP FC players
Pierikos F.C. players
Royal Cappellen F.C. players
2000 African Cup of Nations players
Senegalese expatriate sportspeople in Germany
Expatriate footballers in Germany
Senegalese expatriate sportspeople in Greece
Expatriate footballers in Greece
Senegalese expatriate sportspeople in Cyprus
Expatriate footballers in Cyprus

pl:Salif Keïta